Parapocryptes is a genus of gobies native to the Indian Ocean and the western Pacific Ocean.

Species
There are currently two recognized species in this genus:
 Parapocryptes rictuosus (Valenciennes, 1837)
 Parapocryptes serperaster (J. Richardson, 1846)

Relationship to humans
In Thailand Parapocryptes  was called plā th̀xng theī̀yw (literally: "travel fish"). Because not sedentary behaviors, and can be used as food, especially at Koh Yor in Songkhla Lake, Southern Thailand.

References

Oxudercinae